The Buttahatchee River is a tributary of the Tombigbee River, about  long, in northwestern Alabama and northeastern Mississippi in the United States. Via the Tombigbee River, it is part of the watershed of the Mobile River, which flows to the Gulf of Mexico.

Course
The Buttahatchee River rises in northwestern Winston County, Alabama, near the town of Delmar, and flows generally westward through Marion County, where it collects a short tributary, the West Branch Buttahatchee River. At Hamilton, the river turns to the southwest and flows through Lamar County, Alabama and Monroe County, Mississippi; its lower reach is used to define part of the boundary between Monroe and Lowndes counties.  The Buttahatchee joins the Tombigbee near Columbus Air Force Base, 12 mi (19 km) north-northwest of Columbus.

Name
The name "Buttahatchee" is Choctaw for "sumac river", from bati, "sumac", and hahcha, "river".

The Board on Geographic Names settled on "Buttahatchee River" as the river's official name and spelling in 1947.  According to the Geographic Names Information System, the Buttahatchee River has also been known as:

See also
List of Alabama rivers
List of Mississippi rivers

References

Rivers of Alabama
Rivers of Mississippi
Bodies of water of Lamar County, Alabama
Landforms of Lowndes County, Mississippi
Landforms of Monroe County, Mississippi
Bodies of water of Marion County, Alabama
Bodies of water of Winston County, Alabama
Tributaries of the Tombigbee River
Alabama placenames of Native American origin
Mississippi placenames of Native American origin